The 1968 Puerto Rican general elections were held in Puerto Rico on 5 November 1968. Luis A. Ferré of the New Progressive Party (PNP) was elected Governor. In the House of Representatives elections the PNP won a plurality of the vote, but the Popular Democratic Party won a majority of the seats. They also won a majority of seats in the Senate. Voter turnout was 78.4%.

Results

Governor

House of Representatives

Senate

References

1968 elections in the Caribbean
1968
Elections
Puerto Rico